In and Out of Control is the fourth studio album by The Raveonettes, and was released on 6 October 2009.

Reception

The album received generally positive reviews upon its release. At Metacritic, which assigns a normalised rating out of 100 to reviews from mainstream critics, the album received an average score of 74, based on 16 reviews.

Track listing

Singles
Last Dance/Bang!: The first single from In and Out of Control is a double A-side of Last Dance and Bang! released on a 7" vinyl limited to 1,000. The video for Last Dance was directed by Matthew Lessner.
Heart of Stone: Released as a single with an accompanying video directed by Chris Do.
Gone Forever: Released as a promo single with an accompanying video directed by Nuka Wølk.

References

2009 albums
The Raveonettes albums
Albums produced by Thomas Troelsen
Fierce Panda Records albums
Vice Records albums